"Takin' a Chance" is a song by American singer Whitney Houston, released and promoted as a single in Japan in 1989. The following year the song was included on the Japanese edition of the I'm Your Baby Tonight album released in 1990 on Arista Records. A 3-inch mini CD single and 7-inch vinyl included the b-side "Love Is a Contact Sport" from her album, Whitney.

Commercial promotion
"Takin' a Chance" was used as the theme song of Sanyo TV commercial in Japan.

Chart performance
Takin' a Chance was released in Japan on 21 October 1989, and peaked at number 88 on the Japanese Singles chart.

Live performances
Whitney included the song in her set during her Feels So Right Japan Tour in 1990. The song was performed regularly each night and would mark as the only performance of "Takin' a Chance" on any of Houston's tours thereafter.

Track listing and formats 
Japan, CD Mini singe
A1 "Takin' a Chance" — 4:16 	
B2 "Love Is a Contact Sport" — 4:20 	
Japan, 7"Vinyl single
A1 "Takin' a Chance" — 4:15   	   	
B1 "Love Is a Contact Sport" — 4:21

Charts

External links
Takin' A Chance - Whitney Houston

References

Whitney Houston songs
1989 singles
1989 songs
Contemporary R&B ballads
Pop ballads
Songs written by BeBe Winans
Songs written by Keith Thomas (record producer)
Arista Records singles